The Mitsubishi Pistachio is a three-door hatchback introduced by Mitsubishi Motors in December 1999, based on the platform of their Minica kei car. Only 50 Pistachios were sold in either Citron Yellow and Loire Green colour schemes, priced at ¥959,000, to local authorities and public corporations working to protect the environment.

Specifications
It had a  kerb weight, slim 135/80R13 tyres, electric power steering, lightweight stainless steel exhaust manifold, lightweight aluminium wheels, aluminium hood, thin-gauge glass, and an aluminium seatback. Under the hood, it utilized both gasoline direct injection (GDI) and Automatic Stop-Go (ASG), a system which turns off the engine while the vehicle is stationary and automatically restarts it when the clutch is depressed.

References

Pistachio
Front-wheel-drive vehicles
Hatchbacks
Cars introduced in 1999